Art Journal, established in New York City in 1941, is a publication of the College Art Association of America (referred to as "CAA"). As a peer-reviewed, professionally moderated scholarly journal, its concentrations include:
art practice, art production, art making, art history, visual studies, art theory, and art criticism.  The main contributors are artists, scholars, critics, art historians, and other writers in the arts.  It is both national and international in scope, and in recent years focusing on 20th- and 21st-century art, although for its first decades it concentrated more on traditional art history. 

Membership in CAA includes subscription to Art Journal.  But single issues can be purchased.  Back issues are available on JSTOR and ProQuest.

Awards
 2002, Arts/Literature Coverage, Utne Independent Press Award

References

External links
 Official website

Publications established in 1941
Visual art journals
Art history journals